Norman King (9 April 1915 – 25 May 1973) was an Australian cricketer. He played in five first-class matches for South Australia between 1949 and 1951.

See also
 List of South Australian representative cricketers

References

External links
 

1915 births
1973 deaths
Australian cricketers
South Australia cricketers
Cricketers from Adelaide